The men's decathlon competition at the 2005 World Championships in Athletics was held at the Helsinki Olympic Stadium on Tuesday 9 August and Wednesday 10 August.

Medalists

Schedule

Tuesday, 9 August

Wednesday, 10 August

Records

Final ranking
Points table after 10th event

See also
2005 Hypo-Meeting
2005 Décastar
Athletics at the 2005 Summer Universiade – Men's decathlon
2005 Decathlon Year Ranking

References
 IAAF results: 100 m, long jump, shot put, high jump, 400 m, 110 m hurdles, discus, pole vault, javelin, 1500 m
IAAF results: Final standings

Decathlon
Decathlon at the World Athletics Championships